Glassmanor is an unincorporated community and census-designated place in Prince George's County, Maryland, United States. As of the 2020 census, it had a population of 18,430. In the 1990 and 2000 censuses, the United States Census Bureau had placed Glassmanor and the adjacent community of Oxon Hill in the "Oxon Hill-Glassmanor" census-designated place for statistical purposes. Glassmanor was last delineated separately in 1980, when the CDP recorded a population of 7,751.

The original Glassmanor apartments were built circa 1950 by the Glassman company, just outside the border of southeast Washington. In the mid-1950s, the Eastover shopping center was built across the highway, followed by other adjoining apartment projects in the 1960s. U.S. Senator George McGovern, who was the Democratic Party's presidential candidate in 1972, lived briefly in Glassmanor while a freshman congressman. The area has undergone tremendous demographic and social changes since that time.

Geography
The CDP is bordered by Washington, D.C. to the northwest, the town of Forest Heights to the west, Oxon Hill to the south, Temple Hills to the southeast, Marlow Heights to the east, and Hillcrest Heights to the northeast. Interstate 495/95, the Capital Beltway, forms the southern boundary of the Glassmanor CDP.

Demographics

2020 census

Note: the US Census treats Hispanic/Latino as an ethnic category. This table excludes Latinos from the racial categories and assigns them to a separate category. Hispanics/Latinos can be of any race.

Government
Prince George's County Police Department District 4 Station in Glassmanor CDP, with an Oxon Hill postal address, serves the community. The Prince George's County Fire/EMS Department and Oxon Hill Volunteer Fire Department provide fire protection and emergency medical services from Fire Station 842 located in Glassmanor.

Education
Residents are zoned to Prince George's County Public Schools (PGCPS).

Elementary schools serving sections of the CDP include Barnaby Manor, Flintstone, Forest Heights, Glassmanor, and Valley View. Benjamin Stoddert and Oxon Hill middle schools serve sections of the CDP. All residents are zoned to Potomac High School.

The former Owens Road Elementary School was located within the Glassmanor CDP. The school closed on June 18, 2009.

See also
 Oxon Hill, Maryland

References

Census-designated places in Maryland
Census-designated places in Prince George's County, Maryland